In Portugal, the first open access initiatives were carried out by the University of Minho with the creation of RepositóriUM in 2003 and the definition of an institutional policy of self-archiving in 2004. In the following years began SciELO Portugal, for the publication of open access journals, and new repositories in several higher education institutions. The Open Access Scientific Repository of Portugal (RCAAP) launched in 2008.

Following an agreement signed between the Ministers of Science and Technology of Portugal and Brazil in October 2009, the first Luso-Brasilien Open Access Conference took place in November 2010 in Braga, Portugal.

Open access policies of the country's main scientific research funding agency, Fundação para a Ciência e Tecnologia (Science and Technology Foundation, FCT), came into force on May 5, 2014.

Repositories 
There are a number of collections of scholarship in Portugal housed in digital open access repositories. They contain journal articles, book chapters, data, and other research outputs that are free to read.

See also

 Internet in Portugal
 Education in Portugal
 Media of Portugal
 Redalyc (Red de Revistas Científicas de América Latina y El Caribe, España y Portugal)
 Science and technology in Portugal
 Open access in other countries

References

Further reading
in English
  (About Minho University repository).
 
 
 
  

in Portuguese
 Brandão, Tiago; Moreira, Amilton; Tanqueiro, Sara Ramalho (2021). “As políticas de acesso aberto: história, promessas e tensões”, Ler História, 78, pp. 253-276. DOI: https://doi.org/10.4000/lerhistoria.8560.

External links
 
  (About Open Access Week in Portugal)
 
 
 
 
 

Academia in Portugal
Communications in Portugal
Portugal
Science and technology in Portugal